Alfredo Cornejo Cuevas (born June 6, 1933) is a former Chilean boxer, who won the gold medal in the welterweight division at the 1959 Pan American Games in Chicago, United States. In the same year he also won the world amateur welterweight title in Mexico City. He later fought four professional fights from 1961 to 1962.
As an amateur, he was three times South American Champion; as a light welterweight in Montevideo, Uruguay, 1956, and in Santiago, Chile, 1957, and as a welterweight, in Lima, Peru, 1958. He also competed in the men's welterweight event at the 1960 Summer Olympics.

References

1933 births
Living people
Welterweight boxers
Sportspeople from Santiago
Chilean male boxers
Boxers at the 1959 Pan American Games
Pan American Games gold medalists for Chile
Pan American Games medalists in boxing
Olympic boxers of Chile
Boxers at the 1960 Summer Olympics
Medalists at the 1959 Pan American Games
20th-century Chilean people
21st-century Chilean people